Acapulco H.E.A.T. is a 1993 syndicated television series. It followed the adventures of the "Hemisphere Emergency Action Team" (H.E.A.T.), a group of top-secret agents based in Acapulco in Mexico, recruited by "C-5", a secret, inter-governmental coalition to fight terrorism and other international crimes. To keep a low profile, the team posed as models and photographers representing a beach-fashion business. The show returned for a second season (production started in 1996) with a new and smaller cast; it aired in Europe in 1997, and in the United States during 1998–99.

Synopsis
Led by Ashley Hunter-Coddington (Catherine Oxenberg), a former MI6 operative, and Mike Savage (Brendan Kelly), a former CIA agent, the H.E.A.T. members fight international terrorism and other crimes. They receive their assignments from "Mr. Smith" (John Vernon), the mysterious head of C-5, a secret governmental organization linked to the United Nations.  The team operates from both Puerto Vallarta, Mexico and internationally under the 'cover' of a beach fashion enterprise.
The team's members are: Catherine "Cat" Avery Pascal (Alison Armitage), a former cat-burglar who had to choose between life imprisonment and working in H.E.A.T. for a year in order to have a "clean-slate"; Tommy Chase (Michael Worth), a martial arts expert with a deep understanding of human psychology; Brett Richardson (Spencer Rochfort), a former Navy SEAL with a vast knowledge of explosives; Krissie Valentine (Holly Floria), a computer genius who can do anything with computers, no matter the situation and, who eventually becomes romantically involved with teammate, Marcos Chavez (Randy Vasquez), a member of Mexico's Los Federales, and whose local contacts in their base-of-operations prove very helpful; Arthur Small (Graham Heywood), owner of Acapulco H.E.A.T. Beach Fashion who manages both the team's logistics and its members' false identities in the "Beach Fashion Enterprise" and, Claudio Divanti (Fabio), owner of the hotel where the team is headquartered.

Catherine ("Cat") Avery Pascal and Tommy Chase are the only original characters to return in Season Two. The Season Two storyline explained the time gap (about 3 years) between seasons by stating that the (Season One) H.E.A.T. team had disbanded a few years after the events of Season One. In the interim, "Cat" became a beach-fashion photographer, and Tommy became a "lone wolf". The two were recruited  by ex-spy Nicole Bernard (Lydie Denier) and her protégée, Joanna Barnes (Christa Sauls) a computer expert. They continued fighting international crime backed by private investors; their "cover": owners of a beach-fashion boutique ("Acapulco HEAT Beach Fashion").

Production
The show initially produced only one season (1993–94).  Following a two-year hiatus, Acapulco H.E.A.T. was brought back for a second season with a mostly new cast. This second season was produced in 1996 for worldwide distribution, but also aired in the U.S. during the 1998–99 television season. A planned third season did not materialize. A total of 48 episodes were made and have developed a fan base and international audience. The series continues to be broadcast on cable and streaming channels.

The show's theme song, "I Feel the Heat," was sung by Sable Jeffries (first season) and Pepper Mashay (second season).

Cast and characters

Season 1 (1993–94)
Ashley Hunter-Coddington (Catherine Oxenberg) – A former British MI6 operative and one of the co-leaders of the H.E.A.T. team. She is the daughter of an ambassador. Her mother was killed by Red Brigade members while she was still a child. This traumatic event triggered the need to become a government agent. Her codename is "Sarong" and she worked undercover as a fashion photographer and beach fashion designer.
Michael "Mike" Savage (Brendan Kelly) – A former CIA agent and co-leader of the H.E.A.T. team. He also posed as a photographer for the agency and his codename is "Platform".
Catherine (Cat) Avery Pascal (Alison Armitage) – A French ex-cat burglar, who was required to join the team after being arrested for her crimes. She had to stay with the team for a year in order to avoid prison sentence. She eventually accepted that being on the side of justice was far better. She poses as one of the models of the agency and her codename is "High Dive".
Brett Richardson (Spencer Rochfort) – A  former Navy SEAL and the team's weapons and explosive expert. Posed as one of the team's models and his codename is "Deep End".
Krissie Valentine (Holly Floria) – A computer expert. She provides the team with useful information and research for their missions. Poses undercover as one of the models of the agency and, through the season, got romantically involved with Marcos. Her codename is "Spring Board".
Marcos Chavez (Randy Vasquez) – A member of the Federales in Mexico and an expert in undercover missions. He was romantically involved with Krissie. He poses as the one responsible for providing transportation for the equipment the team uses during their work in fashion (and actually, with the equipment used on their missions). Most of his family members have served as providers of useful information. His codename is "Agua Azul".
Tommy Chase (Michael Worth) – A government member responsible for personality analyses. He is an expert in martial arts and has the "zen warrior" mentality. Poses as one of the team male models; his codename is "Backflip".
Arthur Small (Graham Heywood) – Owner of the beach fashion enterprise, Acapulco Heat beach fashion, which served has the cover for the H.E.A.T. members. Also helped sort out the logistics of each mission.
Claudio Divanti (Fabio) – Owner of the hotel where the team have their headquarters. Used to flirt with Ashley, much to Mike's dislike.
Mr. Smith (John Vernon) – One of the government representatives of C-5, a secret coalition that tasks H.E.A.T. with their missions. C-5 was composed by various members of the U.N. He is seen only via video link.

Season 2 (1998–99)
Catherine (Cat) Avery Pascal (Alison Armitage) – Between the first and second seasons, she became a beach-fashion photographer. As one of the original members of the H.E.A.T. team, she now had to deal with the responsibility of being her own boss. Her new cover was of one of the owners of a small boutique called "Acapulco HEAT Beach Fashions".
Tommy Chase (Michael Worth) – Between the first and second seasons, he started seeing the world with more cynical eyes. He launched a personal fight against drug dealers and small crime. He is the other original member of the H.E.A.T. team to join the new team incarnation. His new cover was of an employee of the small boutique "Acapulco HEAT Beach Fashions".
Nicole Bernard (Lydie Denier) – A former French spy that re-organized the H.E.A.T. team to help her track a stolen necklace, but decided to keep working with them. Her cover was of one of the owners of a small boutique called "Acapulco HEAT Beach Fashions". Very serious, she has trouble trusting people, though she has plenty of trust in her new allies.
Joanna Barnes (Christa Sauls) – The new computer expert of the team and a protégée of Nicole. She can do anything with a computer, though she can never explain how or what she did. Her cover was of one of the employees of the small boutique "Acapulco HEAT Beach Fashions". Though naive, she struggles to keep up a serious appearance.

In Season 2 episode 'Blood Ties', original cast members from Season 1, Spencer Rochfort and Randy Vasquez, returned for a special appearance as their characters Brett Richardson and Marcos Chavez.

Notable guest stars
 James Healey as Niel Strake (Season 1)
 Pedro Armendáriz Jr. as Colonel Rodriguez (Season 1)
 Clifton Collins Jr. as David Kern (Season 1)
 Tristan Rogers as John Hardy (Season 1)
 James Booth as Andre Sokol (Season 1)
 Neil Dickson as Green Victory Agent (Season 1)
 Christopher Neame as Werner Steinholtz (Season 1)
 Liliana Komorowska as Frederika Fluke (Season 1)
 Vaitiare Hirshon as Carmen Chavez (Season 1)
 Julie Bowen as Danielle Perkins (Season 1)
 Nicholas Ball as Derek Perkins (Season 1)
 Andrew Divoff as The Raven (Season 2)
 David Carradine as Victor Garrison (Season 2)
 Chase Masterson as Gwen (Season 2)
 Catherine McGoohan as Natasha Simonova (Season 1) and Sister Margaret (Season 2)
 Tom Paolino as Finley Fairfax (Season 2)
 Richard Lynch as Elliot Roth (Season 2)

Episodes

Season 1 (1993–94)
The first season was produced for syndication in the United States for the 1993–94 television season.

Season 2 (1998–99)
The second season was produced in 1996 for European distribution and airing in 1997, but was not syndicated in the United States until the 1998–99 television season. The dates listed below are the U.S. airdates.

Home media
Mill Creek Entertainment released the entire series on DVD in Region 1 in 2006.  On May 6, 2008, Mill Creek Entertainment released Acapulco H.E.A.T.- The Complete series, an 11-disc boxset featuring all 48 episodes of the series.

As of 2010, these releases have been discontinued and are out of print. As of 2014, all episodes from season 1 can be watched on YouTube, at the Keller Entertainment Group official Acapulco H.E.A.T. channel.
As of July 2021, the show is airing on a United States digital channel American Classic Entertainment, otherwise known as Ace.

 First season DVDs: contain all episodes, with dual soundtrack (English and Spanish); also include several extras, such as promotional pictures, interviews and bios of the cast, and some TV promos.
Second season DVDs: contain all episodes, with dual soundtrack (English and Spanish); also include several extras, such as promotional pictures, cast bios, interviews with Michael Worth and Lydie Denier, and a TV promo. The first and second episode contain production commentaries by Worth.

References

External links
 Acapulco H.E.A.T. in Show Guide
 
 

1993 American television series debuts
1999 American television series endings
American action television series
Fictional intelligence agencies
Espionage television series
First-run syndicated television programs in the United States
Television shows set in Acapulco